Windsor School is a private cooperative school founded in 1959, in Valdivia, Chile. Once bilingual, the school however promotes the study of English language with international exchange programs and an English laboratory. The Windsor School has also football, basketball, hockey, volleyball, and rugby teams, and participates in the ELSA games arranged by Southern Chile's English schools.

External links
 Official website

Schools in Los Ríos Region
Educational institutions established in 1959
1959 establishments in Chile